The Behavioral Risk Factor Surveillance System (BRFSS) is a United States health survey that looks at behavioral risk factors. Begun in 1984, the BRFSS is run by Centers for Disease Control and Prevention and conducted by participating individual state health departments. The survey is administered by telephone and is the world's largest such survey. In 2009, the BRFSS began conducting surveys by cellular phone in addition to traditional “landline” telephones.

Description
The BRFSS is a cross-sectional telephone survey conducted by state health departments with technical and methodological assistance provided by the CDC.  In addition to all 50 states, the BRFSS is also conducted by health departments in The District of Columbia, Guam, Puerto Rico, and the U.S. Virgin Islands.

Individual states can add their own questions to the survey instrument, which consists of a core set of questions on certain topics like car safety, obesity, or exercise.  States get funding from the federal government to administer these questionnaires, and they pay for the additional questions themselves.

The U.S. federal government can then compare states based on the core questions to allocate funding and focus interventions.  The states themselves also use the survey results to focus interventions for the public and to decide what is worth their while to focus on.  City, county, tribal, and local governments also rely on BRFSS data for information about their jurisdictions.

See also
Centers for Disease Control and Prevention
National Center for Health Statistics

References

External links
 Behavioral Risk Factor Surveillance System
 CDC Website

Surveys (human research)
Centers for Disease Control and Prevention